Miss USA 2021 was the 70th Miss USA pageant, held on November 29, 2021, at the Paradise Cove Theater of River Spirit Casino Resort in Tulsa, Oklahoma. The competition was hosted by Zuri Hall and Patrick Ta, while Nicole Adamo served as a lounge host. Asya Branch of Mississippi crowned her successor Elle Smith of Kentucky at the end of the event. This was Kentucky's first title in 15 years. Smith is the third consecutive African American to win the title, and the fifth one in six years. Smith went on to represent the United States at the Miss Universe 2021 pageant, placing in the top 10. The scheduling for the succeeding year's pageant that Smith would serve the pageant for ten months and four days as one of the shortest reigning titleholders in the pageant.

This was the second consecutive year that the pageant was broadcast on FYI, and the first to be streamed live on Hulu. The edition marked the first year of the competition under Crystle Stewart's directorship.

This was the first time since 1993 the State Costume competition took place and held between preliminary and the final competition.

Background
On December 31, 2020, it was announced on Good Morning America that Miss USA and Miss Teen USA would be split from the Miss Universe Organization into a new organization under the helm of Crystle Stewart. Stewart had previously been crowned Miss USA 2008.

Location

On April 20, 2021, it was confirmed by the Muscogee (Creek) Nation that the 2021 edition of Miss USA and Miss Teen USA would be held at the Paradise Cove Theater of River Spirit Casino Resort in Tulsa, Oklahoma. The competition spanned four days, beginning on November 26 and concluding on November 29, 2021. The event reverted to its full spectator capacity after the previous event was downsized to 300 spectators as a precaution to the ongoing COVID-19 pandemic in the United States.

Impact of the COVID-19 on state pageants

The COVID-19 pandemic affected the schedule of Miss USA 2020, postponing it from spring 2020 to November 2020. Each state organization had initially planned to schedule their 2021 pageants for the fall 2020 and winter 2020–21, the typical timeframe for state pageants dating back to the 1970s. However, most state pageants were later rescheduled to spring and summer 2021 to avoid scheduling conflicts with Miss America 2022 state pageants typically took place in most of June 2021, and were further extended to late summer and early fall due to the concerns over the possibility onto the threats of COVID-19 resurgence.

Due to restrictions implemented in all 50 states and the District of Columbia, numerous health and safety guidelines have been implemented for contestants, production members, and audiences at state pageants, such as taking a negative COVID-19 test and following social distancing. Additionally, a number of state pageants have had to alter their initial venue choices due to shut-downs implemented by their governor; either held behind closed doors such as Alaska and Hawaii, with only the contestants and staff were present; most state pageants had limited audition capacity with applying social distancing measures, or some with full capacity.

Selection of contestants
Delegates from the 50 states and District of Columbia were selected in state pageants which began in September 2020. The first state pageants were Idaho and Montana, held together on their original dates of September 27, 2020 and the last state pageant was California, held on September 12, 2021, 350 days after the start of the 2021 pageant season, became the longest in the Miss USA history.

Eleven delegates previously competed in Miss Teen USA and Miss America, in which eight delegates are former Miss Teen USA state winners and three are former Miss America state winners. Kataluna Enriquez, Miss Nevada USA 2021, became the first openly transgender woman to compete in Miss USA.

Results

Placements

§ – Voted into Top 16 through the online vote.

Special awards

Pageant
After the last year's event was impacted by the still-ongoing COVID-19 pandemic, events such as pre-pageant activities and press briefings from pageant commentators were returned across Tulsa.

Preliminary competition
Prior to the final competition, the delegates competed the preliminary competition, where they competed in swim wear and evening gown. It was held on November 26 at River Spirit Casino Resort hosted by Nicole Adamo and Asya Branch.

Finals
As was the case the prior edition, 16 contestants were chosen to advance to the semifinals; 15 of the semifinalists were chosen by the preliminary judges, while one was chosen through the online fan vote. The Top 16 then competed in both swimsuit and evening gown, before eight were chosen to advance. The Top 8 participated in a group discussion round conducted in two groups of four, and afterwards answered their final questions from the judges. The winner and her runners-up were announced afterwards.

Judges

Preliminary
Paul Anthony – American hairstylist
Elan Biongiorno – American celebrity make-up artist
LeeAnne Locken – American reality television personality and Miss Arizona USA 1989
Pamela Price – American marathon runner
Chuck Steelman – American fashion analyst and expert

Finals
Natalía Barulích – Croatian-Cuban model, social media influencer, and singer
Sophie Elgort – American photographer
Chloe Flower – American composer and classical pianist
Ty Hunter – American personal stylist
Haley Kalil – American model and Miss Minnesota USA 2014
Alton Mason – American model
Pascal Mouawad – Lebanese jeweler, businessman, and CEO of Mouawad
Oliver Trevena – English actor and television presenter

Contestants
All 51 state titleholders have been crowned:

Notes

References

External links

 Miss USA official website

2021
November 2021 events in the United States
2021 beauty pageants
Beauty pageants in the United States
2021 in Oklahoma